John William Lawson (September 13, 1837 – February 21, 1905) was a U.S. Representative from Virginia.

Biography

Born in James City County, Virginia, Lawson attended the schools of Williamsburg, College of William and Mary, and the University of Virginia at Charlottesville.
He studied medicine.
He was graduated from the University of the City of New York, March 4, 1861.
He returned to Virginia, and during the Civil War enlisted in the Thirty-second Regiment of Virginia Infantry, Confederate States Army.
He served as assistant surgeon in charge of Artillery battalion.
He was promoted to surgeon March 10, 1864, and served until the surrender at Appomattox April 9, 1865.
He settled in Isle of Wight County, Virginia, December 1865.
Practiced medicine for ten years, when he engaged in agricultural pursuits.
He served as member of the State house of delegates in 1869–1873.
He served in the State senate in 1874–1877.
He was again a member of the State house of delegates in 1883 and 1884.

Lawson was elected as a Democrat to the Fifty-second Congress (March 4, 1891 – March 3, 1893).
He was not a candidate for renomination in 1892.
He resumed farming.
He served as delegate to the State constitutional convention in 1901 and 1902.
He died in Smithfield, Virginia, on February 21, 1905.
He was interred in Ivy Hill Cemetery.

Electoral history

1890; Lawson was elected to the U.S. House of Representatives defeating Republican George Edwin Bowden and Independent Republican C.W. Murdaugh, winning 50.71% of the vote.

Sources

1837 births
1905 deaths
Delegates to Virginia Constitutional Convention of 1901
20th-century American politicians
Democratic Party members of the Virginia House of Delegates
Democratic Party Virginia state senators
Confederate States Army officers
Democratic Party members of the United States House of Representatives from Virginia
People from James City County, Virginia
People from Isle of Wight County, Virginia
American surgeons
Physicians from Virginia
College of William & Mary alumni
University of Virginia alumni
New York University alumni
People of Virginia in the American Civil War
19th-century American politicians